Louie and the Lovers was an American rock band based in Prunedale, California.

History 
While still in high school, the group (then known as Country Fresh) was discovered by Doug Sahm and his wife Violet Sahm; Doug went on to produce the group's debut album. This album, Rise, was released on Epic Records in 1970, but sold poorly. Reviewing it in Christgau's Record Guide (1981), Robert Christgau wrote:

The group recorded a second album for Epic (later re-recorded with Atlantic Records) which was never released, and Louie and the Lovers disbanded soon after. Lead singer and songwriter Louie Ortega continued performing with Sahm after the group's breakup, later playing with the Sir Douglas Quintet and the Texas Tornados.

Long out of print, Rise was reissued on CD by Acadia Records in 2003, and in 2009, Bear Family Records reissued the band's shelved sophomore album, packaged as part of a complete recordings compilation.

Members
Louie Ortega (vocals)
Frank Paredes (guitar)
Steve Vargas (bass)
Albert Parra (drums)

References

Rock music groups from California
Musical quartets